Diana Hajiyeva (born 13 June 1989) is an Azerbaijani singer and songwriter. She is a member and the lead vocalist of the group Dihaj, which represented Azerbaijan in the Eurovision Song Contest 2017 with the song "Skeletons" finishing in 14th place.

Life
Hajiyeva was born in Mariupol, Ukraine while the country was a part of the Soviet Union. Since her childhood she was engaged in music, took lessons on a piano and was interested in jazz. She was a member of the musical collective "Bery Bach".

She graduated from Baku Academy of Music. Here she received the education of a choral conductor. During the years of studying at the academy she was engaged in jazz at a professional level. Currently she works at the Baku Jazz Center.

She lived in London, England, where she graduated from The Institute of Contemporary Music Performance.

Later she launched her personal trio group called Dihaj - from the first letters of her first and last name.

She married Ali Nasirov, a member of Dihaj, in 2009. Together, they have a daughter named Savi.

Eurovision Song Contest
She previously attempted to represent Azerbaijan in the Eurovision Song Contest 2011.

In 2017, she performed the song "Skeletons". She finished in 14th place out of the 26 countries in the final, with a total of 120 points.

Career 
In April 2022, Hajiyeva and pianist Afgan Rasul represented Azerbaijan in the Jazzahead 2022 festival in Germany.

Discography

Singles

References

External links
 Soundcloud

Eurovision Song Contest entrants of 2017
21st-century Azerbaijani women singers
Eurovision Song Contest entrants for Azerbaijan
Azerbaijani women singer-songwriters
Azerbaijani Muslims
Living people
1989 births
Ukrainian people of Azerbaijani descent
People from Mariupol
Baku Academy of Music alumni